Rhadinaea is a genus of snakes of the family Colubridae.

Species
The following 21 species are recognized as being valid.
Rhadinaea bogertorum 
Rhadinaea calligaster 
Rhadinaea cuneata 
Rhadinaea decorata 
Rhadinaea flavilata 
Rhadinaea forbesi 
Rhadinaea fulvivittis 
Rhadinaea gaigeae 
Rhadinaea hesperia 
Rhadinaea laureata 
Rhadinaea macdougalli 
Rhadinaea marcellae 
Rhadinaea montana 
Rhadinaea myersi 
Rhadinaea nuchalis 
Rhadinaea omiltemana 
Rhadinaea pulveriventris 
Rhadinaea quinquelineata 
Rhadinaea sargenti 
Rhadinaea taeniata 
Rhadinaea vermiculaticeps 

Nota bene: A binomial authority in parentheses indicates that the species was originally described in a genus other than Rhadinaea.

References

Further reading
Cope ED (1863). "Descriptions of new American SQUAMATA, in the Museum of the Smithsonian Institution, Washington". Proc. Acad. Nat. Sci. Philadelphia 15: 100–106. (Rhadinæa, new genus, p. 101).

Rhadinaea
Snake genera
Taxa named by Edward Drinker Cope